Fırtına or Peruma is one of the main water streams of Rize Province in the eastern Black Sea Region of Turkey. Its name is Turkish for "storm water". There is a group of more than 20 well-preserved Ottoman-era bridges over the Fırtına Deresi.

Description  
The Fırtına Deresi rises in Kaçkar Mountains in Rize Province and flows to the Black Sea, passing Çamlıhemşin and Ardeşen.

See also 
 Fırtına River bridges

References 

Rivers of Rize Province